Archibald Robertson (May 8, 1765 – December 6, 1835) was a Scottish born painter who operated the Columbian Academy of Painting in New York with his brother Alexander. Known for his miniature portrait paintings, he was asked to paint George and Martha Washington soon after coming to the United States from Scotland. He also made watercolor landscape paintings and engravings. His book Elements of the Graphic Arts was published in 1802.

Early life

Robertson was born in Monymusk, near Aberdeen on May 8, 1765. His mother was Jean Ross and his father, William Robertson, was a draftsman and architect. He was the eldest of three artistic brothers, which included Alexander and Andrew.

Education
Robertson attended Marischal College in Aberdeen from 1782 to 1786, where he studied art. He then studied art in Edinburgh.
In 1786 began his studies with Joshua Reynolds and Benjamin West in London. He also studied art at the Royal Academy of Arts.

Career
Robertson opened an art school and studio in Aberdeen, Scotland following his training in London. Robertson was a successful painter of portraits and miniature portraits. He also engraved, including topographical engravings. Archibald and Alexander collaborated on works, like the engravings.

Archibald came to the United States in 1791 at the invitation of several wealthy individuals to teach art. He was asked to paint the portrait of George and Martha Washington.

Alexander joined his brother in the United States in the autumn of 1792. They established the Columbian Academy of Painting in New York on William Street. It was one of the country's first art schools.  The Columbian Academy of Art was renamed the Academy of Painting, which continued to be managed by Archibald. Alexander opened his own art school in 1802.

Both of the Robertson brothers were active exhibitors and involved in the management of the American Academy of the Fine Arts (AAFA) in New York. Archibald joined in 1817 and was on the board of directors for 15 years.

In New York, Archibald made watercolor landscape paintings of the Hudson River Valley and New York City. In 1802 he had the book, Elements of Drawing, of his systematized approach toward drawing for amateur artists. His approach was inspired by William Sawrey Gilpin.

Personal life
Robertson met Eliza Abramse in the United States and married her in December, 1794 and made several portraits of her. He taught her to paint with watercolors and her work was exhibited at the American Academy of Fine Arts. They had a son, Anthony Lispenard Robertson, who was an attorney and became chief justice. He was the fourth son of many children the couple had.

Death
Roberson died December 6, 1835. He is buried at Green-Wood Cemetery in Brooklyn, New York.

Published works
He published the following books:
 Elements of the Graphic Arts, 1802
 On the Art of Sketching, about 1800, manuscript 
 A book on the art of miniature painting

Notes

References

External links

1765 births
1835 deaths
18th-century Scottish painters
Scottish male painters
18th-century American painters
18th-century American male artists
American male painters
19th-century American painters
Alumni of the University of Aberdeen
People from Aberdeenshire
Scottish emigrants to the United States
Scottish engravers
American engravers
19th-century American male artists